Phagun Bou is an Indian Bengali television soap opera that premiered on 19 March 2018 on Star Jalsha. It was produced under Magic Moments Motion Pictures of Saibal Banerjee and Leena Gangopadhyay. The show starred Vikram Chatterjee and Oindrila Sen in lead roles and Koushik Roy in a negative role. 

The show was shot in parts of North Bengal. In the third week of June 2018, Phagun Bou became the most watched show on its airing channel, Star Jalsha. It had a target rating point of 6.4 in its first week.

Series overview
Phagun Bou dealt with the whimsical nature of the relationship that develops between Ayandeep, (nicknamed Roddur) and Mohul, two strangers destined to be together for life. The series followed the blossoming love between the two after many ups and downs in their relationship, where Mohul was initially inclined towards Ayandeep's brother, Anurup.

Cast

Main
 Vikram Chatterjee as Dr. Ayandeep Ghosh aka Roddur - A doctor and a singer, Mohul's husband.
 Oindrila Sen as Mohul Ghosh

Recurring
 Abhishek Chatterjee as Chandrajit Bose aka Chandu – Bidhumukhi and Amrapali's husband; Bibi, Mohul and Munna's father.(deceased)
 Anushree Das as Bidhumukhi Bose – Chandrajit's first wife, Bibi's mother, Mohul and Munna's stepmother.
 Bidipta Chakraborty as Amrapali Bose  – Chandrajit's second wife, Mohul and Munna's mother, Bibi's stepmother.
 Santu Mukherjee as Jadabendra Ghosh aka Jodu – Roddur's eldest paternal uncle; Amitava, Anirudhha and Rajatava's elder brother; Barshan and Tultuli's father, Nilanjana's father-in-law.
 Lekha Chatterjee as Binapani Ghosh aka Bina - Roddur's younger sister; Amitava and Mayurakshi's daughter.
 Ashmee Ghosh as Sampurna Ghosh - Roddur's younger sister; Amitava and Mayurakshi's daughter.
 Shankar Chakraborty as Amitava Ghosh aka Ankur – Roddur's foster father and elder paternal uncle, Mayurakshi's husband, Tuki's father and Mohul's father-in-law.
 Laboni Sarkar as Mayurakshi Ghosh – Roddur's foster mother and elder aunt, Amitava's wife, Tuki's mother, Anurup's maternal aunt and Mohul's mother-in-law.
 Bharat Kaul as Aniruddha Ghosh aka Ani / Gulu – Malobika's husband, Roddur's biological father, an actor, Mohul's father-in-law.
 Malabika Sen as Malobika Ghosh (née Bose) - Aniruddha's wife, Roddur's biological mother, a classical dancer and former lawyer, Mohul's mother-in-law.
 Suman Banerjee as Gagandeep Ghosh aka Barshan – Jodu's son, Tultuli's elder brother, Roddur's elder cousin brother, a salaryman and Nilanjana's husband.
 Sneha Chatterjee Bhowmick as Nilanjana Ghosh aka Nilu - Gagandeep's wife
 Diganta Bagchi as Rajatava Ghosh - Sonali's husband 
 Rajshree Bhowmick as Sonali Ghosh - Rajatava's wife
 Badshah Moitra as Nilanjan Dutta - Tultuli's second husband, Tuki's husband, Tota's father.
 Koushik Roy as Anurup Mallick aka Roop – Roddur's younger cousin brother, a singer, and Mohul's arch rival, Brishtilekha's estranged husband. Anurup is Mayurakshi's sororal nephew (her sister's son) and has been raised by her.
 Ankita Chakraborty as Brishtilekha Mallick aka Brishti- Anurup's wife, Mohul's rival
 Debolina Mukherjee as Bibi Ghosh - Chandrajit and Bidhumukhi's daughter.
 Madhubani Ghosh Goswami as Madhuparna Ghosh aka Tuki – Roddur's younger cousin sister, Amitava and Mayurakshi's daughter, Nilanjan's second wife, Tota's mother.
 Bulbuli Panja as Simontika Dutta aka Tultuli (née Ghosh) - Chandrajit and Bidhumukhi's daughter.

Background and production

Development
Screenwriter Leena Gangopadhyay who has previously written down the script for Bengali TV shows like ETV Bangla's long-running drama series Sonar Horin and another daily soap Binni Dhaner Khoi, Zee Bangla's partition-themed love saga Keya Patar Nouko, and Star Jalsha's serials Ishti Kutum and Jol Nupur; developed the central idea for Phagun Bou, whose premise was initially based on a rivalrous love triangle.

Casting
Vikram Chatterjee who had previously collaborated with Ganguly and Banerjee in their production Ichche Nodee, was selected to portray the lead role of Dr. Ayandeep Ghosh aka Roddur. Oindrilla Sen who was seen opposite Chatterjee in the 2010 romance drama series "Saat Paake Bandha" (on Zee Bangla), was cast in to play the titular protagonist, Mohul aka "Phagun Bou"; taking into account her onscreen chemistry with Chatterjee. Actor Koushik Roy, noted for his negative portrayal of "Krishnendu Sengupta" in the romance saga Bojhena Se Bojhena; was cast to portray Anurup, the other person aspiring for Mohul's love and the chief antagonist of the seies.

Broadcast and streaming services
The series is telecast everyday on Bengali GEC Star Jalsha and its corresponding channel with HD feed, Star Jalsha HD. It is available via optimum cable connection or by satellite TV connections. The show has been distributed by Star India, in association with Novi Digital Entertainment. On the digital platform, Phagun Bou is available for viewing on the app Hotstar. New episodes are released earlier than on TV, and the service is available for viewers having a premium subscription plan.

Filming
The show has been filmed at several locations, the most prominent being Kalimpong.

Soundtrack
The title song for the series Phagun Bou has been sung by singer Anwesha Dutta Gupta, who has frequently collaborated with the production house Magic Moments Motion Pictures for recording theme songs for Bengali television serials. While, the original music has been given by Debojyoti Mishra.

References

External links

Official Website at Hotstar

2018 Indian television series debuts
Star Jalsha original programming
2019 Indian television series endings
Bengali-language television programming in India